The Montaigne Montesquieu tram stop is located on line  of the tramway de Bordeaux.

Location
The station is located on the avenue des Arts in Pessac, the University area of the CUB.

Junctions
There are no junctions with other tram lines or bus routes at this station.
It will soon be equipped with a third channel for partial terminus.

Close by
 Université Michel de Montaigne Bordeaux III
 Université Montesquieu Bordeaux IV
 Institut d'études politiques de Bordeaux

See also
 TBC
 Tramway de Bordeaux

Bordeaux tramway stops
Tram stops in Pessac
Railway stations in France opened in 2004